Hussain Hindawi is an author, poet, editor, former UN Senior political Advisor in Iraq and editor in chief of the Arabic Services of the United Press International (UPI). He is best known for being the first chairman of Iraq's Independent High Electoral Commission (IHEC), organizing the first elections in Iraq since the fall of Saddam Hussein's regime.

Early life
Born and raised in the Babylonian province Al-Hindiya, Hindawi moved to Baghdad in the 60s, where he studied at the University of Baghdad.

As a rising journalist, Hindawi often published articles citing of his dislike of and objection to Saddam Hussein's methods of ruling, leading Saddam Hussein's thought police to try to torture him into writing in support of the Baathist regime. After suffering numerous injuries during a protest at the Freedom Square in Baghdad, Hindawi fled to Syria via Iraqi Kurdistan by foot, and from there obtained a Visa to France. There, Hindawi spent decades in exile in France where he also resumed his education while living in Paris and Poitiers.
He graduated from the University of Poitiers with a certificate in French, a DEA and a PhD in Philosophy.

Career
In 1990, Hindawi served as a Human Rights consultant for the development work in Yemen and then worked as a research consultant in Lebanon. He then transferred to the UN and worked in Haiti for almost three years, assisting in the International Civilian Mission in Haiti (MICIVIH), a UN scheme. Hindawi then began work in 1995 as the Editor-In-Chief of the London Office of the United Press International, in the Arabic Services.

He left this position when he was requested to serve as the First Chairman of Iraq's first Independent Electoral Commission with the task of organizing Iraq's first multi-party elections in half a century. He then continued this position until mid-2007.

Political life
He then re-joined the United Nations, this time serving in the Iraqi branch (known as the UNAMI), as the Senior Political Advisor, until 2009. In 2010, he combined his position and became the Senior Political and Electoral advisor.

In 2015, Hindawi assumed the position of Advisor to the Iraqi PresidentFuad Masum.

Bibliography
Hindawi has published 11 books, mostly Research-based, in both Arabic and French.

References 

1947 births
Living people
People from Karbala Province
University of Poitiers alumni
Iraqi exiles
Iraqi expatriates in France
Iraqi officials of the United Nations
Iraqi male writers
Male journalists
United Press International people
Iraqi expatriates in the United Kingdom
Iraqi journalists
British Arabic-language poets
21st-century Iraqi poets
20th-century Iraqi poets
Iraqi people of Indian descent